Ted Nash may refer to:

 Ted Nash (entrepreneur)
 Ted Nash (saxophonist, born 1922)
 Ted Nash (saxophonist, born 1960)
 Ted Nash (rower)

See also
Edward Nash (disambiguation)